The Organisation of Islamic Cooperation (OIC;), formerly the Organisation of the Islamic Conference, is an intergovernmental organization founded in 1969, consisting of 57 member states, with 48 being Muslim-majority countries. The organisation states that it is "the collective voice of the Muslim world" and works to "safeguard and protect the interests of the Muslim world in the spirit of promoting international peace and harmony".

The OIC has permanent delegations to the United Nations and the European Union. The official languages of the OIC are Arabic, English, and French. It maintains various affiliated, specialized, and subsidiary organs within the framework of OIC Charter. The member states had a collective population of over 1.8 billion as of 2015, accounting for just under a quarter of the world's population. The collective area is 31.66 m km2.

History
On 21 August 1969, a fire was started in the Al-Aqsa Mosque in Jerusalem. Amin al-Husseini, the former Mufti of Jerusalem, called the arson a "Jewish crime" and called for all Muslim heads of state to convene a summit. The fire, which "destroyed part of the old wooden roof and an 800-year-old pulpit" was blamed on the mental illness of the perpetrator—Australian Christian fundamentalist Denis Michael Rohan—by Israel, and on Zionists and Zionism in general by the Islamic conference.

On 25 September 1969, an Islamic Conference, a summit of representatives of 24 Muslim majority countries (most of the representatives being heads of state), was held in Rabat, Morocco. A resolution was passed stating that

Muslim governments would consult with a view to promoting among themselves close cooperation and mutual assistance in the economic, scientific, cultural and spiritual fields, inspired by the immortal teachings of Islam.

Six months later in March 1970, the First Islamic Conference of Foreign Ministers was held in Jeddah, Saudi Arabia.
In 1972, the Organisation of the Islamic Conference (OIC, now the Organisation of Islamic Cooperation) was founded.

While the al-Aqsa fire is regarded as one of the catalysts for the formation of the OIC, many Muslims have aspired to a pan-Islamic institution that would serve the common political, economic, and social interests of the ummah (Muslim community) since the 19th century. In particular, the collapse of the Ottoman Empire and the Caliphate after World War I left a vacuum.

According to its charter, the OIC aims to preserve Islamic social and economic values; promote solidarity amongst member states; increase cooperation in social, economic, cultural, scientific, and political areas; uphold international peace and security; and advance education, particularly in the fields of science and technology.

The emblem of the OIC contains three main elements that reflect its vision and mission as incorporated in its new Charter. These elements are: the Kaaba, the Globe, and the Crescent.

On 5 August 1990, 45 foreign ministers of the OIC adopted the Cairo Declaration on Human Rights in Islam to serve as a guidance for the member states in the matters of human rights in as much as they are compatible with the Sharia, or Quranic Law.

In March 2008, the OIC conducted a formal revision of its charter.  The revised charter set out to promote human rights, fundamental freedoms, and good governance in all member states. The revisions also removed any mention of the Cairo Declaration on Human Rights in Islam.  Within the revised charter, the OIC has chosen to support the Charter of the United Nations and international law, without mentioning the Universal Declaration of Human Rights.

On 28 June 2011 during the 38th Council of Foreign Ministers meeting (CFM) in Astana, Kazakhstan, the organisation changed its name from Organisation of the Islamic Conference to its current name. The OIC also changed its logo at this time.

Refugees
According to the UNHCR, OIC countries hosted 18 million refugees by the end of 2010. Since then OIC members have absorbed refugees from other conflicts, including the uprising in Syria. In May 2012, the OIC addressed these concerns at the "Refugees in the Muslim World" conference in Ashgabat, Turkmenistan.

Member states

The Organisation of Islamic Cooperation has 57 members, 56 of which are also member states of the United Nations, the exception being Palestine. Some members, especially in West Africa and South America, are—though with large Muslim populations—not necessarily Muslim majority countries. Bosnia and Herzegovina, the Central African Republic, Thailand, Russia, and Northern Cyprus (under the name "Turkish Cypriot State") are observer states, and other organisations and groups also participate as observers.

The collective population of OIC member states is over 1.9 billion as of 2018.

Africa

Asia

Europe

Americas

Positions
The Parliamentary Union of the OIC Member States (PUOICM) was established in Iran in 1999, and its head office is situated in Tehran. Only OIC members are entitled to membership in the union.

On 27 June 2007, then-United States President George W. Bush announced that the United States would establish an envoy to the OIC. Bush said of the envoy, "Our special envoy will listen to and learn from representatives from Muslim states, and will share with them America's views and values." , Arsalan Suleman is acting special envoy. He was appointed on 13 February 2015. In an investigation of the accuracy of a series of chain emails, Snopes.com reported that during the October 2003April 2004 session of the General Assembly, 17 individual members of the OIC voted against the United States 88% of the time.

The OIC, on 28 March 2008, joined the criticism of the film Fitna by Dutch lawmaker Geert Wilders, which features disturbing images of violent acts juxtaposed with alleged verses from the Quran.

In March 2015, the OIC announced its support for the Saudi Arabian-led intervention in Yemen against the Shia Houthis.

Israeli–Palestinian conflict
The OIC supports a two-state solution to the Israeli–Palestinian conflict.

The OIC has called for boycott of Israeli products in effort to pressure Israel into ending the occupation of the Palestinian territories.

There was a meeting in Conakry, Guinea, in 2013. Secretary-General Ekmeleddin Ihsanoglu said that foreign ministers would discuss the possibility of cutting ties with any state that recognised Jerusalem as the capital of Israel or that moves its embassy to its environs.

In December 2017, the extraordinary meeting held to response Donald Trump's decision on recognizing Jerusalem, resulting "Istanbul Declaration on Freedom for Al Quds."

In September 2019, the OIC condemned Benjamin Netanyahu's plans to annex the eastern portion of the occupied West Bank known as the Jordan Valley.

Relationship with India

Islam is the second-largest religion in India after Hinduism, with over 200 million Muslims making up approximately 15% of the country's total population; India has the largest Muslim population outside of Muslim-majority or Islamic states. However, India's relationship with Pakistan, the latter being an Islamic state, has been riddled with hostilities and armed conflict since the 1947 Partition of India. The poor relationship between the two states has had a direct impact on India–OIC relations due to Pakistan's status as a founding member of the organization. India has pushed for the OIC to accept it as a member state, arguing that Indian Muslims comprise 11% of the world's total Muslim population; Pakistan has staunchly opposed the entry of India into the organization.

Pakistan has cited its conflict with India over the Kashmir region as the reason for its opposition, and frequently accuses India of perpetrating widespread human rights abuses against Kashmiris in the Indian-administered territory of Jammu and Kashmir, which has witnessed an ongoing militant uprising since the 1980s. The OIC has been urged to press India on the Kashmir dispute, and has faced pushback from Indian officials for occasional references to Jammu and Kashmir as territory that is militarily occupied by India. Historically, the Muslim world has largely lent its support to Pakistan over India during any armed conflicts between the two states. Despite these issues, the first OIC summit held in 1969 in Rabat did not address the Kashmir dispute, and granting India membership in the organization was discussed nonetheless. The head of the Indian delegation, the then ambassador to Morocco, also addressed the gathering at the summit. The erstwhile President of Pakistan, Yahya Khan, reportedly expressed mixed views towards the induction of India into the OIC as a full member. The Indian delegation, led by the then Indian President Fakhruddin Ali Ahmad, was scheduled to arrive at the summit but ultimately was not allowed in due to threats by Pakistan to boycott the event, leading to controversy. Differences between the two states led Pakistan to keep India out for the final session of the 1969 conference and all OIC summits thereafter.

2019 Pulwama attack and India–Pakistan standoff 
On 14 February 2019, a suicide-bombing attack by a Muslim militant in Jammu and Kashmir killed over 40 Indian soldiers, and was claimed by Jaish-e-Mohammed, a Pakistan-based terrorist group. In March 2019, India conducted airstrikes in Pakistani territory, which subsequently led to the 2019 India–Pakistan military standoff.

After these events, Indian Foreign Minister Sushma Swaraj was invited to participate in an OIC summit. However, Pakistan protested this development and demanded that India be blocked from the event, accusing the latter of an unprovoked violation of Pakistani airspace while Indian officials claimed that the strike was carried out on terrorist-training camps within Pakistan. Following requests by Pakistan shortly after the 14 February attack, the OIC held an emergency meeting on 26 February to discuss the Kashmir dispute. The organization subsequently condemned India's military response to the attack and advised both sides to exercise restraint.

For the first time in five decades, the United Arab Emirates invited India as a "guest of honour" to attend the inaugural plenary 46th meeting of OIC foreign ministers in Abu Dhabi on 1 and 2 March 2019, overruling protests by Pakistan. Shortly afterwards, Pakistan boycotted the meeting objecting to the invitation of India. Indian Foreign Minister Swaraj served as the head for the Indian delegation and attended the summit.

On 18 April 2020, the OIC had issued a statement, urging the Modi administration of India to take urgent steps to "stop the growing tide of Islamophobia", citing attacks by Hindu nationalists against Indian Muslims and the allegation against Muslims of spreading COVID-19 in the country (see Violence against Muslims in India).

Cartoons of Muhammad

Cartoons of Muhammad, published in a Danish newspaper in September 2005, were found offensive by a number of Muslims. Third Extraordinary Session of the Islamic Summit Conference in December 2005 condemned publication of the cartoons, resulting in broader coverage of the issue by news media in Muslim countries. Subsequently, violent demonstrations throughout the Islamic world resulted in several deaths.

Human rights
OIC created the Cairo Declaration on Human Rights in Islam. While proponents claim it is not an alternative to the UDHR, but rather complementary to it, Article 24 states that "all the rights and freedoms stipulated in this Declaration are subject to the Islamic Shari'ah" and Article 25 follows with "the Islamic Shari'ah is the only source of reference for the explanation or clarification of any of the articles of this Declaration." Attempts to have it adopted by the United Nations Human Rights Council have met increasing criticism, because of its contradiction of the UDHR, including from liberal Muslim groups. Critics of the CDHR state bluntly that it is "manipulation and hypocrisy," "designed to dilute, if not altogether eliminate, civil and political rights protected by international law" and attempts to "circumvent these principles [of freedom and equality]."

Human Rights Watch says that OIC has "fought doggedly" and successfully within the United Nations Human Rights Council to shield states from criticism, except when it comes to criticism of Israel. For example, when independent experts reported violations of human rights in the 2006 Lebanon War, "state after state from the OIC took the floor to denounce the experts for daring to look beyond Israeli violations to discuss Hezbollah's as well." OIC demands that the council "should work cooperatively with abusive governments rather than condemn them." HRW responds that this works with those who are willing to cooperate; others exploit the passivity.

The OIC has been criticised for failing to discuss the treatment of ethnic minorities within member countries, such as the oppression of the Kurds in Syria and Turkey, the Ahwaz in Iran, the Hazaras in Afghanistan, the 'Al-Akhdam' in Yemen, or the Berbers in Algeria.

Along with the revisions of the OIC's charter in 2008, the member states created the Independent Permanent Human Rights Commission (IPHRC). The IPHRC is an advisory body, independent from the OIC, composed of eighteen individuals from a variety of educational and professional backgrounds. The IPHRC has the power to monitor human rights within the member states and facilitates the integration of human rights into all OIC mandates.  The IPHRC also aids in the promotion of political, civil, and economic rights in all member states.

In September 2017, the Independent Human Rights Commission (IPHRC) of the OIC strongly condemned the human rights violations against the Rohingya Muslims in Myanmar.

In December 2018, the OIC tentatively raised the issue of China's Xinjiang re-education camps and human rights abuses against the Uyghur Muslim minority. The OIC reversed its position after a visit to Xinjiang, and in March 2019, the OIC issued a report on human rights for Muslim minorities that praised China for "providing care to its Muslim citizens" and looked forward to greater cooperation with the PRC.
In December 2020 a coalition of American Muslim groups criticized the Organization of Islamic Cooperation for failing to speak up to prevent the abuse of the Uyghurs and accused member states of being influenced by Chinese power. The groups included the Council on American-Islamic Relations.

LGBT rights

In March 2012, the United Nations Human Rights Council held its first discussion of discrimination based on sexual orientation and gender identity, following the 2011 passage of a resolution supporting LGBT rights proposed by the Republic of South Africa. Pakistan's representative addressed the session on behalf of the OIC, denouncing the discussion and questioning the concept of sexual orientation, which he said was being used to promote "licentious behaviour ... against the fundamental teachings of various religions, including Islam". He stated that the council should not discuss the topic again. Most Arab countries and some African ones later walked out of the session.

Nonetheless, OIC members Albania, Gabon, Guinea-Bissau,  Suriname and Sierra Leone have signed a UN Declaration supporting LGBT rights in the General Assembly. Whilst Bahrain, Iraq, Jordan and Turkey had legalized homosexuality.

In May 2016, 57 countries including Egypt, Iran, Pakistan, Saudi Arabia and the United Arab Emirates from the Organization of Islamic Cooperation requested the removal of LGBT associations from 2016 High Level Meeting on Ending AIDS, sparking protests by the United States, Canada, the European Union and LGBT communities.

Science and technology
The Organization of Islamic Cooperation (OIC) held its first science and technology summit at the level of head of state and government in Astana, Republic of Kazakhstan, on 10–11 September 2017.

Astana Declaration
The Astana Declaration is a policy guidance adopted by OIC members at the Astana Summit. The Astana Declaration commits members to increase investment in science and technology, education, eradicate extreme poverty, and implement UN Sustainable Development Goals.

Non-state terrorism
In 1999, OIC adopted the OIC Convention on Combatting International Terrorism. Human Rights Watch has noted that the definition of terrorism in article 1 describes "any act or threat of violence carried out with the aim of, among other things, imperiling people’s honour, occupying or seizing public or private property, or threatening the stability, territorial integrity, political unity or sovereignty of a state." HRW views this as vague, ill-defined and including much that is outside the generally accepted understandings of the concept of terrorism. In HRW's view, it labels, or could easily be used to label, as terrorist actions, acts of peaceful expression, association, and assembly.

Legal scholar Ben Saul of University of Sydney argues that the definition is subjective and ambiguous and concludes that there is "serious danger of the abusive use of terrorist prosecutions against political opponents" and others.

Furthermore, HRW is concerned by OIC's apparent unwillingness to recognise as terrorism acts that serve causes endorsed by their member states. Article 2 reads: "Peoples' struggle including armed struggle against foreign occupation, aggression, colonialism, and hegemony, aimed at liberation and self-determination." HRW has suggested to OIC that they embrace "longstanding and universally recognised international human rights standards", a request that has as yet not led to any results.

During a meeting in Malaysia in April 2002, delegates discussed terrorism but failed to reach a definition of it. They rejected, however, any description of the Palestinian fight with Israel as terrorism. Their declaration was explicit: "We reject any attempt to link terrorism to the struggle of the Palestinian people in the exercise of their inalienable right to establish their independent state with Al-Quds Al-Shrif (Jerusalem) as its capital." In fact, at the outset of the meeting, the OIC countries signed a statement praising the Palestinians and their "blessed intifada." The word terrorism was restricted to describe Israel, whom they condemned for "state terrorism" in their war with the Palestinian people.

At the 34th Islamic Conference of Foreign Ministers (ICFM), an OIC section, in May 2007, the foreign ministers termed Islamophobia "the worst form of terrorism".

Dispute with Thailand
Thailand has responded to OIC criticism of human rights abuses in the Muslim majority provinces of Pattani, Yala, and Narathiwat in the south of the country. In a statement issued on 18 October 2005, secretary-general Ihsanoglu vocalised concern over the continuing conflict in the south that "claimed the lives of innocent people and forced the migration of local people out of their places". He also stressed that the Thai government's security approach to the crisis would aggravate the situation and lead to continued violence.

On 18–19 April 2009, the exiled Patani leader Abu Yasir Fikri (see Patani United Liberation Organisation) was invited to the OIC to speak about the conflict and present a solution to end the violence between the Thai government and the ethnically Malay Muslims living in the socioeconomically neglected south, that has been struggling against Thai assimilation policy and for self governance since it became annexed by Thailand in 1902. Fikri presented a six-point solution at the conference in Jiddah that included obtaining the same basic rights as other groups when it came to right of language, religion, and culture. He also suggested that Thailand give up its discriminatory policies against the Patani people and allow Patani to at least be allowed the same self-governing rights as other regions in Thailand already have, citing that this does not go against the Thai constitution since it has been done in other parts of Thailand and that it is a matter of political will. He also criticised the Thai government's escalation of violence by arming and creating Buddhist militia groups and questioned their intentions. He added Thai policies of not investigating corruption, murder, and human rights violations perpetrated by Bangkok-led administration and military personnel against the Malay Muslim population was an obstacle for achieving peace and healing the deep wounds of being treated as third-class citizens.

Thailand responded to this criticism over its policies. The Thai foreign minister, Kantathi Suphamongkhon, said: "We have made it clear to the OIC several times that the violence in the deep South is not caused by religious conflict and the government grants protection to all of our citizens no matter what religion they embrace." The Foreign Ministry issued a statement dismissing the OIC's criticism and accusing it of disseminating misperceptions and misinformation about the situation in the southern provinces. "If the OIC secretariat really wants to promote the cause of peace and harmony in the three southern provinces of Thailand, the responsibility falls on the OIC secretariat to strongly condemn the militants, who are perpetrating these acts of violence against both Thai Muslims and Thai Buddhists." HRW and Amnesty International have echoed the same concerns as OIC, rebuffing Thailand's attempts to dismiss the issue.

Notable meetings 

A number of OIC meetings have attracted global attention.

Ninth meeting of PUOICM
The ninth meeting of Parliamentary Union of the OIC member states (PUOICM) was held on 15 and 16 February 2007 in Kuala Lumpur, Malaysia. The speaker of Malaysia's House of Representatives, Ramli bin Ngah Talib, delivered a speech at the beginning of the inaugural ceremony. OIC secretary-general Ekmeleddin Ihsanoglu said prior to the meeting that one main agenda item was stopping Israel from continuing its excavation at the Western Wall of the Temple Mount / Masjid Al-Aqsa, Islam's third holiest site. The OIC also discussed how it might send peacekeeping troops to Muslim states, as well as the possibility of a change in the name of the body and its charter. Additionally, return of the sovereignty right to the Iraqi people along with withdrawal of foreign troops from Iraq was another one of the main issues on the agenda.

Pakistani Foreign Minister Khurshid Mahmud Kasuri told reporters on 14 February 2007 that the secretary general of OIC and foreign ministers of seven "like-minded Muslim countries" would meet in Islamabad on 25 February 2007 following meetings of President Musharraf with heads of key Muslim countries to discuss "a new initiative" for the resolution of the Israeli–Palestinian conflict. Kasuri said this would be a meeting of foreign ministers of key Muslim countries to discuss and prepare for a summit in Makkah Al Mukarramah to seek the resolution of the Arab–Israeli conflict.

IPHRC Trip to Washington DC
In December 2012, the IPHRC met in Washington, D.C. for the first time. The IPHRC held meetings at the National Press Club, Capitol Hill, and Freedom House discussing the issues of human rights defense in the OIC member states. During their roundtable discussion with Freedom House, the IPHRC emphasised the adoption of the Universal Declaration of Human Rights and the rejection of the Cairo Declaration by the OIC.

Observer Status dispute
The September 2014's high-level Summit of the OIC, in New York, ended without adopting any resolutions or conclusions, for the first time in several years in the modern history of the organization, due to a dispute regarding the status of one of its Observer states. Egypt, Iran and the United Arab Emirates have demanded that the OIC remove the term 'Turkish Cypriot State' in reference to the unrecognized Turkish Republic of Northern Cyprus (TRNC), which has observer status within the organization. Egypt's president Abdel Fattah el-Sisi insisted that any reference to the "Turkish Republic of Northern Cyprus or Turkish Cypriot State" was unacceptable and was ultimately the reason for the OIC not adopting any resolutions or conclusions in the 2014 summit.

Structure and organisation

The organisation was previously known as Organization of the Islamic Conference. The 2011 38th session of the OIC council of foreign ministers adopted a resolution for consensus on adopting new logo and name. The OIC is headquartered in Jeddah, Saudi Arabia with regional offices in New York, Geneva, Brussels, Iraq, Kabul, and Indonesia.

The OIC sponspors four universities: the Islamic University of Technology, which is a subsidiary organ; the Islamic University in Uganda, which is an affiliated institution; the Islamic University of Niger, which is an affiliated institution; and the International Islamic University Malaysia, which is also an affiliated institution.

The OIC system consists of:

Islamic Summit

The largest meeting, attended by the heads of state and government of the member states, convenes every three years.  The Islamic Summit takes policy decisions and provide guidance on all issues pertaining to the realisation of the objectives as provided for in the Charter and consider other issues of concern to the Member States and the Ummah.

Islamic Conference of Foreign Ministers

Islamic Conference of Foreign Ministers meets once a year to examine a progress report on the implementation of its decisions taken within the framework of the policy defined by the Islamic Summit.

Secretary General

The Secretary General is elected by the Council of Foreign Ministers for a period of five years, renewable once. The Secretary-General is elected from among nationals of the Member States in accordance with the principles of equitable geographical distribution, rotation and equal opportunity for all Member States with due consideration to competence, integrity and experience.

Permanent Secretariat
The Permanent Secretariat is the executive organ of the Organisation, entrusted with the implementation of the decisions of the two preceding bodies, and is located in Jeddah, Saudi Arabia. The Secretary General of the Organization of Islamic Cooperation (OIC) is Dr. Yousef A. Al-Othaimeen.  He received his office on, Tuesday, 29 November 2016

Subsidiary organisations

 The Statistical, Economic and Social Research and Training Centre for Islamic Countries, in Ankara, Turkey
 The Research Centre for Islamic History, Art and Culture (IRCICA), located in Istanbul, Turkey
 The Islamic University of Technology, located in Dhaka, Bangladesh
 The Islamic Centre for the Development of Trade, located in Casablanca, Morocco
 The Islamic Fiqh Academy, located in Jeddah, Saudi Arabia
 The Islamsate Islamic Network, located at Riyadh, Saudi Arabia
 The Executive Bureau of the Islamic Solidarity Fund and its Waqf, located in Jeddah, Saudi Arabia
 The Islamic University in Niger, located in Say, Niger.
 The Islamic University in Uganda, located in Mbale, Uganda.
 The Tabriz Islamic Arts University, located in Tabriz, Iran.

Specialised institutions
 The Islamic Educational, Scientific and Cultural Organisation (ISESCO), located in Rabat, Morocco.
 The Islamic States Broadcasting Organisation (ISBO) and the International Islamic News Agency (IINA), located in Jeddah, Saudi Arabia

Affiliated institutions
 Islamabad Chamber of Commerce & Industry (ICCI), located in Karachi, Pakistan.
 World Islamic Economic Forum (WIEF), located in Kuala Lumpur, Malaysia.
 Organisation of Islamic Capitals and Cities (OICC), located in Jeddah, Saudi Arabia.
 Sports Federation of Islamic Solidarity Games, located in Riyadh, Saudi Arabia.
 Islamic Committee of the International Crescent (ICIC), located in Benghazi, Libya.
 Islamic Shipowners Association (ISA), located in Jeddah, Saudi Arabia.
 World Federation of International Arab-Islamic Schools, located in Jeddah, Saudi Arabia.
 International Association of Islamic Banks (IAIB), located in Jeddah, Saudi Arabia.
 Islamic Conference Youth Forum for Dialogue and Cooperation (ICYF-DC), located in Istanbul, Turkey.
 General Council for Islamic Banks and Financial Institutions (CIBAFI), located in Manama, Bahrain.
 Standards and Metrology Institute for Islamic Countries (SMIIC), located in Istanbul, Turkey.

Criticism 

OIC has been criticised by many Muslims for its lack of real engagement and solutions for Muslim countries in crisis. It is said to have made progress in social and academic terms but not politically.

In 2020, Pakistan's Minister of Foreign Affairs SM Qureshi criticized OIC for its stand with regards to Kashmir issue, stating with Pakistan might consider to call a meeting of Islamic countries that are ready to stand with them on the issue. This comment invited immediate retaliation from Saudi Arabia, where the latter forced Pakistan to repay 1 Billion dollars from the 3 Billion dollars loan it had taken in 2018 and by also ending its oil supply credit.

List of Summits

See also 

 Azerbaijan–OIC relations
 Cairo Declaration on Human Rights in Islam
 D-8 Organization for Economic Cooperation
 Flag of the Organisation of Islamic Cooperation
 Islamic Military Counter Terrorism Coalition
 Islamic Reporting Initiative
 Islamic University of Technology
 List of largest cities in Organisation of Islamic Cooperation member countries
 Demographics of the member states of the Organisation of Islamic Cooperation
 Pakistan and the Organisation of Islamic Cooperation

References

Further reading 
 Al-Huda, Qamar. "Organisation of the Islamic Conference". Encyclopedia of Islam and the Muslim World. Edited by Martin, Richard C. Macmillan Reference, 2004. Vol. 1. p. 394, 20 April 2008.
 Ankerl, Guy. Coexisting Contemporary Civilisations: Arabo-Muslim, Bharati, Chinese, and Western. Geneva, INUPress, 2000, .

External links
 

 
Organizations established in 1969
United Nations General Assembly observers
Temple Mount
Intergovernmental organizations established by treaty
Islamic conferences
1960s in Islam
Islamic organisations based in Saudi Arabia
International political organizations
International diplomatic organizations
Political organisations based in Saudi Arabia